The Tennessee Tech Golden Eagles women's basketball team is the women's basketball team that represents Tennessee Technological University in Cookeville, Tennessee, United States. The school's team currently competes in the Ohio Valley Conference.

History
As of the end of the 2015-16 season, the Golden Eagles have a 901-503 all-time record. They reached the Second Round of the NCAA Tournament in 1987, 1989, 1990.

Postseason results

NCAA Division I

AIAW Division I
The Golden Eagles made five appearances in the AIAW National Division I basketball tournament, with a combined record of 10–9.

References

External links